Ateliers and Chantiers de Bacalan was formed after the bankruptcy of Compagnie des Chantiers et Ateliers de l'Ocean in 1868. Although it possessed the shipyard of its predecessor, it made no use of the facility and instead focused on industrial engines and machinery. It also managed the Saint-Nazaire shipyard for the Compagnie Générale Transatlantique from its founding until the shipyard closed in 1871. In 1879 it merged with the Belgian company Ateliers de la Dyle to form Société Anonyme de Travaux Dyle et Bacalan and resumed shipbuilding.

Bibliography

1869 establishments in France
1879 disestablishments in France
Bordeaux
Shipyards of France